Monerista is a genus of moth in the family Lecithoceridae. It contains the species Monerista hippastis, which is found in India (Assam).

The wingspan is 10–12 mm. The forewings are ochreous-yellow in males and white more or less suffused with ochreous-yellow, especially on margins in females. There is a small deep yellow basal patch, in males containing a large tuft of raised scales. There is a broad deep ochreous-yellow or yellow-brown fasciae before middle and about three-fourths, confluent on the dorsum. The apex are deep yellow or yellow-brown. The hindwings are dark grey in males, with a submedian streak thinly scaled and yellowish-tinged. The hindwings of the females are whitish.

References

Natural History Museum Lepidoptera genus database

Lecithoceridae
Monotypic moth genera